Modern Men is an American television sitcom that premiered March 17, 2006, on The WB. The series stars Eric Lively, Josh Braaten, and Max Greenfield as three single men and lifelong friends, who hire a life coach to help them with their love lives. Wendie Malick played the life coach in the pilot episode, but when her series Jake in Progress was renewed, the role was recast with Jane Seymour. Marla Sokoloff and George Wendt are also part of the cast.

The series was created by writers Ross McCall and Aaron Peters. It is the first situation comedy by executive producer Jerry Bruckheimer. The show was canceled due to poor ratings.

Cast
 Jane Seymour as Dr. Victoria Stangel
 Josh Braaten as Tim Clarke
 Max Greenfield as Kyle Brewster
 Eric Lively as Doug Reynolds
 Marla Sokoloff as Molly Clarke
 George Wendt as Tug Clarke
 Deanna Wright as Allie

Episodes

References

External links
 

2000s American sitcoms
2006 American television series debuts
2006 American television series endings
English-language television shows
Television series by Warner Bros. Television Studios
Television shows set in Chicago
The WB original programming